Halopterididae is a family of hydrozoans.

According to the World Register of Marine Species, the following genera belong to the family Halopterididae:
Anarthroclada Naumov, 1955
Antennella Allman, 1877
Antennellopsis Jäderholm, 1896
Astrolabia Naumov, 1955
Calvinia Nutting, 1900
Cladoplumaria Ansin Agis, Ramil & Vervoort, 2004
Corhiza Millard, 1962
Diplopteroides Peña Cantero & Vervoort, 1999
Gattya Allman, 1885
Halopteris Allman, 1877
Monostaechas Allman, 1877
Nuditheca Nutting, 1900
Pentatheca Naumov, 1955
Polyplumaria Sars, 1874

References

 
Plumularioidea
Cnidarian families